Kohlu district is a district of the Balochistan province of Pakistan. It is bounded in the north by Loralai District, Dera Bugti in the south, Barkhan in the east, and Sibi District in the west.

Demographics
At the time of the 2017 census the district had a population of 213,933, of which 112,124 were males and 101,809 females. Rural population was 196,490 (91.85%) while the urban population was 17,443 (8.15%). The literacy rate was 18.77% - the male literacy rate was 25.91% while the female literacy rate was 10.48%. 289 people in the district were from religious minorities.

At the time of the 2017 census, 93.15% of the population spoke Balochi and 5.09% Pashto as their first language.

Education 
According to the Pakistan District Education Rankings 2017, district Kohlu is ranked at number 116 out of the 141 ranked districts in Pakistan on the education score index. This index considers learning, gender parity and retention in the district.

Literacy rate in 2014–15 of population 10 years and older in the district stands at 32%, whereas for females it is only 12%.

Post primary access is a major issue in the district with 91% of schools being at primary level. Compare this with high schools, which constitute only 4% of government schools in the district. This is also reflected in the enrollment figures for 2015–17 with 2,754 students enrolled in class 1 to 5 and only 8 students enrolled in class 9 and 10.

Gender disparity is another issue in the district. Only 20% schools in the district are girls’ schools. Access to education for girls is a major issue in the district and is also reflected in the low literacy rates for females.

Moreover, the schools in the district lack basic facilities. According to Alif Ailaan district education rankings 2017, the district is ranked at number 150 out of the 155 districts of Pakistan for primary school infrastructure. At the middle school level, it is ranked at number 149 out of the 155 districts. These rankings take into account the basic facilities available in schools including drinking water, working toilet, availability of electricity, existence of a boundary wall and general building condition. More than 4 out of 5 schools do not have electricity. 9 out 10 schools lack a toilet and 3 out of 4 schools do not have a boundary wall. 1 out of 2 schools do not have clean drinking water.

References

Bibliography

External links

 Kohlu District at www.balochistan.gov.pk
 Kohlu District at www.balochistanpolice.gov.pk

 
Districts of Balochistan, Pakistan